West Molokai Volcano, sometimes called Mauna Loa for the census-designated place, is an extinct shield volcano comprising the western half of Molokai island in the U.S. state of Hawaii.

Geology
It was formed in two volcanic phases during the Pleistocene epoch of the Quaternary period in the Cenozoic Era.

The first formed the broad tholeiitic shield volcano of West Molokai that ended 1.89 million years ago. The second volcanic phase produced postshield alkalic volcanics 1.76 million years ago. There is no evidence for a rejuvenated phase of the West Molokai Volcano, whilst the East Molokai Volcano does. 

West Molokai overlaps the western flank of East Molokai Volcano, a much larger shield volcano comprising two-thirds of Molokai. Two distinct rift zones are present on the western flank of the volcano, forming a v shape. A third rift zone possibly exented eastward towards the modern day East Molokai Volcano.
A collapse occurred around (uncertain) years ago on the eastern/north eastern flank of the volcano and lava flows from East Molokai had filled in the open space, connecting the two volcanoes above surface (also known as the Molokai Saddle). The cliffs of the eastern side of West Molokai is the only remaining evidence for this land slip. Keep note that the West Molokai slip is completely separate from the much larger slip of the East Molokai Volcano.

References

External links

Volcanoes of Maui Nui
Landforms of Molokai
Shield volcanoes of the United States
Hotspot volcanoes
Polygenetic volcanoes
Pleistocene shield volcanoes
Pleistocene Oceania
Cenozoic Hawaii
Extinct volcanoes